Catoptria dimorphellus is a species of moth in the family Crambidae described by Otto Staudinger in 1882. It is found in Spain, Greece and on Sicily , as well as in Turkey and  Syria.

References

Moths described in 1882
Crambini
Moths of Europe
Moths of Asia